Daniel E. Beren (November 3, 1929 – December 14, 2014) was a Republican member of the Pennsylvania House of Representatives.

References

Republican Party members of the Pennsylvania House of Representatives
2014 deaths
1929 births